Elephant meat is the flesh and other edible parts of elephants.

History
Elephant meat has likely been a source of food for humans during the entire time of the species' coexistence. By the beginning of the Middle Palaeolithic, around 120,000 BCE, African societies were hunter-gatherers proficient in exploiting herds of elephants for their meat.

A specimen of the now-extinct straight-tusked elephant was discovered in the Ebbsfleet Valley, near Swanscombe. The 400,000-year-old skeleton was found with flint tools scattered around, suggesting the elephant had been cut up by a tribe of the early humans existing at the time, known as Homo heidelbergensis.

Modern times
Today, all species of elephant are hunted specifically for their meat. This occurs notably in Cameroon, Central African Republic, Republic of Congo, and the Democratic Republic of Congo. During ivory hunts by poachers, meat may be taken as a by-product for eventual sale, or to feed the hunting party. , wildlife experts expressed concerns that the major threat to elephants may become the demand for meat rather than the ivory trade. Organisations such as the WWF and TRAFFIC are campaigning to reduce consumption levels as this, along with the ivory trade, leads to as many as 55 individuals being killed a day.

Consumption during the Zambezi expedition
Scottish explorer David Livingstone describes how he ate an elephant during the Zambezi expedition in a 1861 letter to Lord Palmerston. He wrote "when we killed an elephant for food, the rest of the herd stood a mile off for two days."

Consumption during the 1870 Siege of Paris

During the Siege of Paris in 1870, elephant meat was consumed, due to a severe shortage of food. Along with other animals at the zoo Jardin des Plantes in Paris, both Castor and Pollux were killed and eaten. Contemporary accounts indicate that elephant meat did not appeal to Parisian diners.

Demand

An investigation into the elephant meat trade revealed that in four central African countries, the demand for the meat is higher than the supply. In cities, the meat is considered to be prestigious, and as such, costs more to buy than most other meats. This acts as an incentive for poachers to hunt elephants for their meat as well as their tusks. Another incentive comes from "commanditaires". These are individuals with wealth, usually people with influence in the military, government, or the business world, and are known to fund elephant hunts. They provide money, equipment, and also weapons. Their main objective is to receive ivory in return, which they sell.

Those working in logging camps provide local demand for elephant meat. Construction of the associated logging roads eases access from areas that were once remote, to sites where the meat can be sold.

Forest elephants in Africa are normally around 5,000 to 6,000 pounds. While the ivory may be sold for around $180 (in 2007), a poacher could sell the meat (approximately 1,000 pounds) for up to $6,000. During this time, Africans living in the Congo Basin were earning an average of around $1 per day.

In 2007, elephant meat was selling in Bangui (Central African Republic) markets at $5.45 per pound. This was at the same time that ivory could be sold by poachers for $13.60 a pound. The meat was being transported and sold over the border of the Central African Republic and the Democratic Republic of the Congo. Despite being illegal according to international law, both governments collected taxes for the transactions.

In 2012, wildlife officials in Thailand expressed the concern that a new taste for elephant meat consumption could pose a risk to their survival. They were alerted to the problem upon discovering that two elephants in a national park were slaughtered. The director-general of the wildlife agency in Thailand stated that some of the meat was eaten raw.

Preservation
The meat may be charred on the outside and smoked at the site where the elephant is killed, to preserve it during transportation to populated areas for sale.

Statistics
Utilization of the meat and earnings estimates in Cameroon, Central African Republic, Republic of Congo, and the Democratic Republic of Congo were compiled as follows by Daniel Stiles in his 2011 Elephant Meat Trade in Central Africa: Summary report:

Utilization
Utilization of the meat of recalled elephant that were killed:

Potential earnings
Potential earnings estimates from elephant meat (smoked) that was reported as sold:

* 60% of the carcass; see Utilization table above, column "Smoked meat sold"
Ranges begin at zero because not all elephant hunters take the meat; however, in the Republic of Congo sample, all of the reported kills resulted in at least some meat being taken.

Cultural and religious practices
Assamese scriptures prescribe various meats, including that of the elephant, to recover from illness and to stay in good health. 
Buddhist monks, however, are forbidden from eating elephant meat. Hindus also strictly avoid any contact with elephant meat due to the importance of the god Ganesha who is widely worshiped by Hindus.

Elephant meat is also forbidden by Jewish dietary laws because they do not have cloven hooves and they are not ruminants. Some scholars of Islamic dietary laws have ruled that it is forbidden for Muslims to eat elephant because elephants fall under the prohibited category of fanged or predatory animals.

References

External links
 Stiles, D. (2011). Elephant Meat Trade in Central Africa: Summary report . (PDF). Gland, Switzerland: IUCN. 103pp.
 African Elephants and the Bushmeat Trade (PDF), May 2002, Bushmeat Crisis Task Force (BCTF)

Meat by animal
Elephants
Elephant hunting